Belmez may refer to:
Belmez, a village in Córdoba, Andalucia, Spain
Bélmez de la Moraleda, a city in Jaén, Andalusia, Spain
Belmez (horse) a thoroughbred racehorse.

See also
Bélmez Faces, an apparently paranormal phenomenon in Bélmez de la Moraleda